The 1992 World Fencing Championships were held from 10 July to 12 July 1992 in Havana, Cuba for women's team épée and women's individual épée, both of which were not held at the 1992 Summer Olympics.

Medal summary

Medal table

See also 
 Fencing at the 1992 Summer Olympics

References

FIE Results

World Fencing Championships
W
Sports competitions in Havana
1992 in Cuban sport
20th century in Havana
International fencing competitions hosted by Cuba
July 1992 sports events in North America